The 1985 Torneo Internazionale Roger et Gallet was a men's tennis tournament played on outdoor clay courts in Florence, Italy that was part of the 1985 Nabisco Grand Prix circuit. It was the 13th edition of the tournament and was played from 20 May until 26 May 1985. Unseeded Sergio Casal, who entered the competition as a qualifier, won the singles title.

Finals

Singles
 Sergio Casal defeated  Jimmy Arias 3–6, 6–3, 6–2
 It was Casal's only singles title of his career.

Doubles
 David Graham /  Laurie Warder defeated  Bruce Derlin /  Carl Limberger 6–1, 6–1

References

External links
 ITF tournament edition details

Torneo Internazionale Roger et Gallet
Torneo Internazionale Roger et Gallet